Howard Richard Sherman (born 15 June 1943) is a former English cricketer.  Sherman was a right-handed batsman who bowled right-arm off break.  He was born at Seven Kings, Essex.

Sherman made his first-class debut for Essex against Cambridge University in 1967.  He made twelve further first-class appearances for the county, the last of which came against Surrey in the 1969 County Championship.  In his thirteen first-class appearances, he scored 448 runs at a batting average of 24.88, with a high score of 66.  This score, which was one of four half centuries he made, came against Nottinghamshire in 1967.  He also made a single List A appearance against Somerset at Johnson Park in the 1969 Player's County League.  He scored 2 runs in this match before being dismissed by Peter Robinson, with Somerset winning by 2 wickets.

References

External links
Howard Sherman at ESPNcricinfo
Howard Sherman at CricketArchive

1943 births
Living people
People from the London Borough of Redbridge
English cricketers
Essex cricketers